The January 2009 North American ice storm was a major ice storm that impacted parts of Kansas,  Oklahoma, Arkansas, Missouri, Illinois, Indiana, Ohio, West Virginia, Tennessee, and Kentucky. The storm produced widespread power outages for over 2 million people due to heavy ice accumulation. The hardest-hit areas were in Kentucky with over 500,000 residences without power during the height of the storm, including 100,000 without power for over one week, and northern Arkansas, with 300,000 residences without power. This ice storm killed 65 people nationwide and 35 in Kentucky. Most deaths were attributed to carbon monoxide poisoning due to power generators or kerosene heaters being used indoors without proper ventilation. Kentucky Governor Steve Beshear called up the entire Kentucky Army National Guard to deal with the after-effects of this storm, the largest National Guard call up in that state's history. Mammoth Caves closed due to the storm.

Emergency response teams from NRWA state affiliates, including the Arkansas, Kentucky, Oklahoma, Missouri, and Florida rural water associations, provided portable generators and technical assistance to maintain the water supply in the impacted areas.

Gallery

See also
 December 2008 Northeastern United States ice storm
 Global storm activity of 2009
 Freezing rain

External links 

 Arkansas Ice Storm Pictures

References

2009 01
2009 meteorology
Natural disasters in Kentucky
North American ice storm
2009 natural disasters in the United States
2009 cold waves
Cold waves in the United States